System G may refer to:

Technology
 System G (supercomputer),  a cluster supercomputer at Virginia Tech
 CCIR System G, a 625-line analog television transmission format